Independent Left ("Independent Party of the Left Wing") is a minor unregistered Irish political party with a socialist and environmentalist outlook. It was founded in January 2019.

History
Independent Left was founded in Dublin in January 2019 in the run up to the 2019 local elections. Its members include John Lyons, Niamh McDonald and Conor Kostick.

In the 2014 local elections, John Lyons was elected in Dublin Beaumont-Donaghmede ward standing as a member of People Before Profit. Lyons stood for election to the Dáil for Dublin Bay North in the 2016 Irish general election. He was not elected, being eliminated on the fourteenth count in seventh place for a five-seat constituency with 8,476 votes. On 7 January 2019, John Lyons left People Before Profit, saying the decision was a hard one, but “the difficulties I've had with the leadership of PBP over the future direction of the party in the Dublin Bay North area over the past six months could ultimately not be resolved.”

In the 2019 local election, the Beaumont-Donaghmede constituency was redrawn and Lyons stood for Independent Left in the Artane-Whitehall constituency in Dublin City Council, being elected to the third (of six) seat on the sixth count. In the same election Niamh McDonald stood in the Donaghmede constituency, where she obtained 562 first preference votes, but was not elected.

John Lyons stood for Independent Left in the Dublin Bay North constituency at the 2020 general election. He was eliminated on the 13th count with 6,421 votes after transfers. His first preference vote was 1,882.

Policies
Independent Left describe themselves as, "a new movement for environmentalism, socialism, freedom and equality." Their election material called for an environmentally sustainable city with easy access to public housing, healthcare and public transport. On NearFM, John Lyons advocated that all of the land that Dublin City Council control be used for public, affordable housing. Niamh McDonald has called for the introduction of community child care schemes, on a not-for-profit model.

References

External links

2019 establishments in Ireland
Political parties established in 2019
Left-wing politics in Ireland
Environmentalism in the Republic of Ireland
Socialist parties in Ireland